Robin Schuster (born April 24, 1987) is a German former professional footballer who played as a central defender. He is the brother of Julian Schuster and the cousin of Benedikt Röcker.

External links

1987 births
Living people
Association football defenders
German footballers
VfB Stuttgart II players
SC Freiburg players
SG Sonnenhof Großaspach players
3. Liga players
People from Bietigheim-Bissingen
Sportspeople from Stuttgart (region)
Footballers from Baden-Württemberg